Mamini is a town in central Ivory Coast. It is a sub-prefecture of Bouaké Department in Gbêkê Region, Vallée du Bandama District.

Mamini was a commune until March 2012, when it became one of 1126 communes nationwide that were abolished.

In 2014, the population of the sub-prefecture of Mamini was 15,200.

Villages
The 31 villages of the sub-prefecture of Mamini and their population in 2014 are:

Notes

Sub-prefectures of Gbêkê
Former communes of Ivory Coast